Estación Rancagua,  is a railway station of the Empresa de los Ferrocarriles del Estado in Rancagua, Chile. It is the main railway station in the Libertador General Bernardo O'Higgins Region. Estación Rancagua is part of the Red Sur EFE, the TerraSur inter-city service, and the Metrotrén commuter service stops here.

Lines and trains 
The following lines and trains pass through or terminate at Estación Rancagua:

Red Sur EFE
TerraSur inter-city service (Alameda - Estación Chillán)
Metrotrén commuter service (Alameda - Estación San Fernando)

Adjacent stations

External links 
 Empresa de los Ferrocarriles del Estado
 Metrotrén
 Terrasur

Rancagua
Buildings and structures in O'Higgins Region
Transport in O'Higgins Region